Pearson Best (born 20 December 1963) is a former Cayman Islands cricketer. An all-rounder, he is a right-handed batsman and right-arm slow-medium bowler, he has played for the Cayman Islands national cricket team since the year 2000. His matches include two first-class and four List A matches.

Playing career

Best made his debut for the Cayman Islands in the Red Stripe Bowl, a domestic competition in the West Indies, in October 2000. He played four matches in the tournament, making up his only four List A matches to date. He played in the ICC Americas Championship in 2002 and 2004 and in the repêchage tournament for the 2005 ICC Trophy in 2005. In the latter tournament, he won man of the match awards for his performances against Kuwait and Zambia, finishing the tournament with the best batting average (76.33) and the second highest score of 99 not out.

In August 2005 he played his, to date, only first-class matches, 2005 ICC Intercontinental Cup matches against Bermuda and Canada. In 2006, he played for the Cayman Islands in the inaugural Stanford 20/20 tournament. He top scored with 74 in the preliminary round against the Bahamas, winning $25,000 for the man of the match award, but only scored three in the first round proper against Trinidad & Tobago as the Caymans were knocked out of the tournament. Only three players made a higher individual score in the tournament.

Later in 2006, he again played in the Americas Championship. He was the second highest scorer in the tournament, winning the man of the match award for his top score of 116 against Argentina. He most recently represented the Cayman Islands at Division Three of the World Cricket League in Darwin, Australia in May/June 2007.

References

1963 births
Living people
Caymanian cricketers
Barbadian emigrants to the Cayman Islands
Barbadian cricket coaches